ZeKaeM, abbreviated from Zagreb Youth Theater is a theatre in Zagreb, Croatia formerly run by the Union of Pioneers of Yugoslavia. The theater is also important for its school for children.

History
It goal was to pedagogically develop the creative potential of children through theatre. In 1967, it changed its name to the current one, and in 1977, it became a professional theatre employing young, just graduated actors.

Reception
It is regarded as one of the three most important experimental Zagreb theatres in recent times, alongside Exit Theatre and Teatar &TD. It is considered by some as the cradle of Croatian contemporary theatrical scene due to a large number of actors and authors studying there.

External links
Official website

References

Theatres in Zagreb